Sir Henry Joseph Twynam, KCSI, CIE (24 April 1887–21 October 1966) was a British administrator in India. He was Governor of the Central Provinces and Berar from 1940 to 1946.

References 

 https://www.ukwhoswho.com/view/10.1093/ww/9780199540891.001.0001/ww-9780199540884-e-49882

Indian Civil Service (British India) officers
1887 births
1966 deaths
Knights Commander of the Order of the Star of India
Companions of the Order of the Indian Empire
People educated at Ratcliffe College
British people in colonial India